Associazione Sportiva Dilettantistica Calcio Chiasiellis, more commonly known simply as Calcio Chiasiellis, was an Italian women's football team from Chiasiellis, Italy.

Founded in 1982, it reached Serie A in 2007. Chiasiellis tightly avoided relegation in its debut in the top category and subsequently improved with two 8th spots. In 2011 the team ended 7th, their best-ever performance.

References 

Chiasiellis
Chiasiellis
Mortegliano